Constantin Sandu (born 15 September 1993) is a Moldovan footballer who plays as a midfielder for Petrocub Hîncești in the Moldovan National Division.

Club career
On 21 January 2021, Sandu signed for Petrocub Hîncești, which he also played for between 2015 and 2016.

International career
Sandu made his international debut for Moldova on 12 October 2018, coming on as a substitute in the 79th minute for Radu Gînsari in the 2018–19 UEFA Nations League D match against San Marino, which finished as a 2–0 home win.

Career statistics

International

References

External links
 
 
 

1993 births
Living people
Footballers from Chișinău
Moldovan footballers
Moldova international footballers
Moldovan expatriate footballers
Expatriate footballers in Italy
Association football midfielders
FC Academia Chișinău players
CS Petrocub Hîncești players
FC Saxan players
Speranța Nisporeni players
Moldovan Super Liga players
Serie D players